Neil Patrick Jordan (born 25 February 1950) is an Irish film director, screenwriter, novelist and short-story writer. His first book, Night in Tunisia, won a Somerset Maugham Award and the Guardian Fiction Prize in 1979. He won an Academy Award (Best Original Screenplay) for The Crying Game (1992). He has also won three Irish Film and Television Awards, as well as the Golden Lion at the Venice International Film Festival for Michael Collins (1996) and the Silver Bear for Best Director at the Berlin International Film Festival for The Butcher Boy (1997).

Jordan also created The Borgias (2011 TV series) for Showtime and Riviera (2017 TV series) for Sky Atlantic.

Early life
Jordan was born in Sligo, the son of Angela (née O'Brien), a painter, and Michael Jordan, a professor. He was educated at St. Paul's College, Raheny.  Later, Jordan attended University College Dublin, where he studied Irish history and English literature. He graduated in 1972 with a BA in History. He became involved in student theatre there, where he met Jim Sheridan, who also was later to become an important Irish film director. Of his religious background, Jordan said in a 1999 Salon interview: "I was brought up a Catholic and was quite religious at one stage in my life, when I was young. But it left me with no scars whatever; it just sort of vanished." He said about his current beliefs that "God is the greatest imaginary being of all time. Along with Einstein's General Theory of Relativity, the invention of God is probably the greatest creation of human thought."

Career
Neil Jordan's career began in the late 1970s working for the Irish television channel, RTÉ. Included in his work was writing storylines for the children's fantasy series, Wanderly Wagon.

In 1981, when John Boorman was filming Excalibur in Ireland, he recruited Jordan as a "creative associate". A year later Boorman was executive producer on Jordan's first feature Angel, a tale of a musician caught up in the Troubles played by Stephen Rea who has subsequently appeared in almost all of Jordan's films to date. During the 1980s, he directed films that won him acclaim, including The Company of Wolves and Mona Lisa, both made in England. The Company of Wolves, a dark and sexually-themed reimagining of the Little Red Riding Hood fairy tale based on short stories by Angela Carter, became a cult favourite.

As a writer/director, Jordan has a highly idiosyncratic body of work, ranging from mainstream hits like Interview with the Vampire to commercial failures like We're No Angels to a variety of more personal, low-budget arthouse pictures. He was also the driving force behind the cable TV series The Borgias.

Unconventional sexual relationships are a recurring theme in Jordan's work, and he often finds a sympathetic side to characters that audiences would traditionally consider deviant or downright horrifying. His film The Miracle, for instance, followed two characters who struggled to resist a strong, incestuous attraction. Interview with the Vampire, like the Anne Rice book it was based on, focused on the intense, intimate interpersonal relationship of two undead men who murder humans nightly (although the pair never have sex, they are clearly lovers of a sort), accompanied by an equally complex vampire woman who is eternally trapped in the body of a little girl. While Lestat (Tom Cruise) is depicted in an attractive but villainous manner, his partner Louis (Brad Pitt) and the child vampire Claudia (Kirsten Dunst) are meant to capture the audience's sympathy despite their predatory nature. In the remake of The End of the Affair, two people (Ralph Fiennes and Julianne Moore) engage in a love affair that will end as suddenly as it started, with both not wanting its end.

In addition to the unusual sexuality of Jordan's films, he frequently returns to the Troubles of Northern Ireland. The Crying Game and Breakfast on Pluto both concern a transgender character (played by Jaye Davidson and Cillian Murphy, respectively), both concern The Troubles, and both feature frequent Jordan leading man Stephen Rea. The two films, however, are very different, with Crying Game being a realistic thriller/romance and Breakfast on Pluto a much more episodic, stylised, darkly comic biography. Jordan also frequently tells stories about children or young people, such as The Miracle and The Butcher Boy. While his pictures are most often grounded in reality, he occasionally directs more fantastic or dreamlike films, such as The Company of Wolves, High Spirits, Interview with the Vampire and In Dreams.

The critical success of Jordan's early pictures led him to Hollywood, where he directed High Spirits and We're No Angels; both were critical and financial disasters. He later returned home to make the more personal The Crying Game, which was nominated for six Academy Awards. Jordan won the Academy Award for Best Original Screenplay for the film. Its unexpected success led him back to American studio filmmaking, where he directed Interview with the Vampire. He also directed the crime drama The Brave One starring Jodie Foster.

Neil Gaiman announced during his Today show appearance on 27 January 2009, that Neil Jordan would be directing the film of his Newbery Medal-winning book The Graveyard Book. Jordan also wrote and directed the 2009 Irish-made film Ondine, starring Colin Farrell and Alicja Bachleda-Curuś. He also directed Byzantium, an adaptation of the vampire play of the same name starring Saoirse Ronan, Gemma Arterton and Jonny Lee Miller.

In 2011, Jordan's next feature was announced as the later aborted sci-fi romance Broken Dream, which was to have featured Ben Kingsley and John Hurt.

He directed the thriller Greta (2018), starring Isabelle Huppert and Chloë Grace Moretz.

After working on the scripts for Riviera Neil Jordan has disowned Riviera, due to his scripts being reworked by others. He said he has no idea who rewrote these episodes. "They were changed, to my huge surprise and considerable upset. There were various sexual scenes introduced into the story and a lot of very expository dialogue. I objected in the strongest terms possible."

Personal life 
Jordan has five children: Anna and Sarah from his marriage to solicitor Vivienne Shields; Dashiel and Daniel from his current marriage to Brenda Rawn, and Ben, from a relationship with architect Mary Donohoe.

Jordan lives in Dalkey, Dublin.

In 1996, Neil Jordan was honoured with receiving the French Ordre des Arts et des Lettres.

He has received many honorary doctorates, most notably from Trinity College Dublin, University College Dublin, and Queen's University Belfast.

In 2009, he signed a petition in support of director Roman Polanski, calling for his release after he was arrested in Switzerland in relation to his 1977 charge for drugging and raping a 13-year-old girl.

In 2018, he has donated his archives to the National Library of Ireland. Jordan's donation included TV and film scripts, production files, notebooks, storyboards and personal correspondence with artists and political figures.

Filmography

Film

Television

Bibliography
 Night in Tunisia (1976, short stories)
 The Past (1980, novel)
 The Dream of a Beast (1983, novella)
 Mona Lisa (1986, screenplay) co-written by David Leland
 Angel (1989, screenplay)
 A Neil Jordan Reader (1993) collects A Night in Tunisia, The Dream of a Beast, and The Crying Game (screenplay)
 Sunrise with Sea Monster (1994, novel) published in the US as ‘’Nightlines’’
 Michael Collins: Screenplay and Film Diary (1996, screenplay)
 Shade (2004, novel)
 Mistaken (2011, novel)
 The Drowned Detective (2016, novel)
 Carnivalesque (2017, novel)

Awards
 Guardian Fiction Prize and Somerset Maugham Award for Night in Tunisia (1979)
 Rooney Prize for Irish Literature in 1981
 2004 Irish PEN Award
 Kerry Group Irish Fiction Award for 'Shade' (2005) and Mistaken (2011)
 2011 Irish Book Awards Novel of the Year for 'Mistaken'
 UCD Alumni Award in Arts & Humanities 2021

Awards received by Jordan movies

References

Further reading
Nolan, Val, Neil Jordan: Works for the Page (Cork: Cork University Press, 2022).
Pramaggiore, Maria, Neil Jordan (Urbana and Chicago: University of Illinois Press, 2008).
Rockett, Emer and Rockett, Kevin, Neil Jordan: Exploring Boundaries (Dublin: Liffey Press, 2003).
Zucker, Carole, The Cinema of Neil Jordan: Dark Carnival (London: Wallflower Press, 2008) 
Zucker, Carole (ed.), Neil Jordan Interviews (Jackson, MS: University Press of Mississippi, 2013)

External links

 Neil Jordan's web site
 
 
 Neil Jordan "Breakfast On Pluto" Interview

1950 births
Living people
People from Clontarf, Dublin
People from Dalkey
People from County Sligo
People educated at St Paul's College, Raheny
Aosdána members
Best Adapted Screenplay BAFTA Award winners
Best Original Screenplay Academy Award winners
Former Roman Catholics
Irish atheists
Irish film directors
Irish former Christians
Irish novelists
Irish screenwriters
Irish male screenwriters
Irish male short story writers
Directors of Golden Lion winners
Silver Bear for Best Director recipients
Writers Guild of America Award winners
Irish PEN Award for Literature winners
20th-century Irish writers
20th-century Irish male writers
21st-century Irish writers
21st-century Irish male writers
Irish male novelists
20th-century Irish short story writers
21st-century Irish short story writers